Thorning may refer to:
 Thorning Parish, parish of the Danish National Church in the Danish municipality of Silkeborg.
 Thorning (town), town in the Silkeborg Municipality, Central Denmark Region, Denmark. 
 Helle Thorning-Schmidt, Danish politician, Prime Minister of Denmark.